Rationalist International is an organization with the stated aim to represent a rational view of the world.

External links
Rationalist International Homepage

Rationalist groups based in India
Organizations established in 1995
Atheist organizations